Munkamba Airport  is an airport serving the town of Munkamba in Kasaï-Central Province, Democratic Republic of the Congo.

See also

Transport in the Democratic Republic of the Congo
List of airports in the Democratic Republic of the Congo

References

External links
 FallingRain -  Munkamba Airport
 HERE Maps - Munkamba
 OpenStreetMap - Munkamba
 OurAirports - Munkamba Airport

Airports in Kasaï-Central